Los Flechazos (Spanish for The Arrow Shots) were a Spanish mod band of the 1980s and 1990s whose musical style was strongly influenced by the sounds of British musical groups of the 1960s.  Besides numerous original compositions, they also played several cover versions of other artists' songs, e.g. of the Rupert's People and Phil Spector.  After twelve years, the group disbanded in 1998.  Currently, Alejandro "Álex" Díez Garin has his own musical project known as "Cooper".

Discography 
 "Viviendo en la era pop", 1988 (Dro)
 "En el club", 1989 (Dro)
 "¡Preparados, listos, ya!", 1991 (Dro)
 "¡En acción!", 1992 (Dro)
 "El sorprendente sonido de Los Flechazos", 1993 (Dro)
 "Alta fidelidad", 1995 (Elefant)
 "Haciendo astillas el reloj", 1996 (Dro)
 "Dias grises", 1996 (Elefant)
 "Pussycat", 1996 (Fortune; live album of the Beat-O-Mania in Munich)

External links 
 

Spanish rock music groups
Spanish pop music groups
Musical groups established in 1986
Musical groups disestablished in 1998
1986 in Spanish music
1998 in Spain
Province of León
1986 establishments in Spain.